The Coodabeen Champions (often referred to as "The Coodabeens") are an Australian comedy team with radio programs broadcast on the ACE Radio Network in Melbourne on 1377AM 3MP and sell as across regional Victoria and Southern New South Wales. The Coodabeens Footy Show is broadcast between 4.00 pm – 6.00 pm. The Coodabeens have been a feature on Melbourne radio for 40 years. Their producer is Andy "Young Andy" Bellairs. On 24 October 2021, The Coodabeen Champions announced on Twitter that their 2022 programme will broadcast on 3MP and Ace Radio Networks, after being at the ABC for over 27 years.

Coodabeens Footy Show
The program began in 1981 on 3RRR and has twice moved to 3AW.  It is now broadcast primarily on ABC Radio Melbourne and ABC Victoria. It is mainly focused on Australian rules football, with the Coodabeens discussing current sports events and news in a humorous manner, also interviewing numerous retired football players and commentators. Its current members are Jeff Richardson, Ian Cover, Greg Champion, "Torch" McGee and Billy Baxter. Simon Whelan had a hiatus from the show while serving as a judge of the Supreme Court of Victoria, but has returned as of April 2020.  Former members of the group include Tony Leonard.

The show includes various regular segments, including:
Covie's Quiz: a football-related quiz run by Ian Cover.
Guru Bob: a fictional Guru – he has belonged to various religions – who claims to relate advice to Australian Football League players and coaches who "visit the temple", often giving them comical spins on well-known philosophical quotes as this advice. He is described as the Coodabeens' Special Adviser on Football Spirituality and has released numerous books of football quotes. For example, "It says in The Bible, Book of Shane 3:11: 'It is harder to win a Premiership, than it is to put a needle into the eye of a camel'."
Greg's Songs: Greg Champion, a singer-songwriter, performs parodies of popular songs and relates them to Australian rules footballers. Most of the lyrics are contributed by listeners
Bush Footy: regional Australian football stories are told through interviews with country footy identities.
Torch's Footy Talkback: a fictional talk radio segment, with callers phoning in with various football questions, rumours or thoughts, often in the form of humorous and subtle attacks against football personalities. Regular talkback callers include: Sauce from Sea Lake, Lance from Lara, Wayne from Wantirna, Donnie from Devonport, Peter from Peterborough, Danny from Droop Street (Footscray), Barrie from the Barossa Valley, Stan from Stradbroke Island, Cayden from Caroline Springs, Hayden from Hawthorn, Nige from Nth Fitzroy and Pearl from the Peninsula among others. Former talkback callers include: Hans from Hahndorf, Massive Merv from Moorabbin, Digger and Tiny Timmy from Thomastown.
Sam the Sub: A new segment in 2011 where the Coodabeens take a call from the offices of fictional football publication 'Outside Football' to get the headlines for the day's newspaper. Sam mainly uses alliteration to provide some funny take on a current football issue. He's a Collingwood supporter and usually 'publishes' Collingwood news on the 'front page'.

In previous years, the Coodabeen Champions Footy Show has also featured segments such as "One-game wonders" in which the Coodabeens track down a former footballer who played one game of VFL/AFL football and "Oh brother!" in which the Coodabeens speak to the brother of a former AFL/VFL player who played at the highest level.

Former programs
Sunday Nights: This program ran 12 months of the year and was on air between 6:30 pm and 9:00 pm each Sunday. The program was discontinued in 2008. A number of this program's elements were incorporated in the Coodabeens' Saturday Soiree program. These included Magic Moments, Greg's songs and live music guests
The Idlers: Saturday night program that concentrated on Australian travel and leisure topics. The program initially ran from 8:00 pm until 10:00 pm on Saturday evenings in the non-AFL season and then from 6:30 pm to 8:00 pm on Saturday evenings. This program made way for the Saturday Soiree'' in 2008.The Saturday Night Soiree''': This program ran in the non-football season, but due to expanding sport broadcasts, the show eventually could only be streamed via the internet or on digital radio. The ABC quietly cut the show in 2013.

Awards
In 2003, the Coodabeen Champions were inducted into the MCG Media Hall of Fame.

References

External links
Coodabeens website
ABC Coodabeens profile

Australian Broadcasting Corporation radio programs
Victoria (Australia) musical groups